Ellingham, Harbridge and Ibsley is a civil parish in the west of the English county of Hampshire. The population of the civil parish at the 2011 Census was 1,171.

The civil parish was formed in 1974 by the amalgamation of the three titular villages which had all been civil parishes in their own right, it forms part of the New Forest District.

The main geographical features of the area are the A338 road (connecting Poole and Bournemouth with Salisbury) and the Hampshire Avon. The nearest towns are Ringwood and Fordingbridge.

Populated places in the parish include:
Ellingham
Furze Hill
Harbridge
Highwood
Ibsley
Linford
Linwood
Mockbeggar
Moyles Court School
Poulner
Rockford
Shobley
Somerley
South Gorley
Turmer

References

External links

Ellingham, Harbridge and Ibsley Parish Council

Civil parishes in Hampshire
New Forest District